Clare Corbett is a British actress, and is a winner (2000) of a Carleton Hobbs Radio Award.  She studied at the Welsh College of Music and Drama and has appeared in television programmes such as Casualty, Eastenders and Doctors, as well as a number of radio plays (including Absolute Power, Venus and Adonis and Dr. Zhivago), and video games, including the Dark Souls series along with other Soulslikes by FromSoftware.

She has narrated numerous audiobooks including Vanessa and Her Sister, Shopaholic to the Stars, and The Girl on the Train, which won the 2016 Audie Award for Audiobook of the Year.

In 2017 she was nominated for "Best Supporting Actor/Actress" in the BBC Audio Drama Awards for her role as Franciska Lazar in the drama serial Keeping the Wolf Out.

Filmography

Film

Television

Video games

Audiobooks (partial list) 

 Night Music (2009)
 I've Got Your Number (2012)
Dying Fall: A Ruth Galloway Investigation (Book 5) (2013)
The Outcast Dead: A Ruth Galloway Investigation (Book 6) (2014)
 Shopaholic to the Stars (2014)
 How to Get a (Love) Life (2014)
 The Girl on the Train (2015)
The Ghost Fields: A Ruth Galloway Investigation (Book 7) (2015)
 Vanessa and Her Sister (2015)
 Demelza (Poldark Book 2) (2015)
 The Widow (2016)
 Revenger (2016)
 The Child (2017)
 Her Frozen Heart (2017)
 The Hunting Party (2018)
 The Rumour (2018)
 Doctor Who: The Good Doctor (2018)
 The Feed (2018)
 The Suspect (2019)
 Lanny (2019)
 Flights (2019)

References

External links 
 

English film actresses
English television actresses
English video game actresses
English voice actresses
Living people
21st-century English actresses
Year of birth missing (living people)